"Whenever I Say Your Name" is a duet by English musician Sting and American singer Mary J. Blige. It serves as the second single from Sting's seventh studio album Sacred Love (2003). It was not originally included on Blige's sixth studio album Love & Life but was later added to the album's international re-release. The recording won Best Pop Collaboration with Vocals at the 46th Grammy Awards in 2004.

The single was the third and final non-US single from Love & Life. The track was released in mid-2004, only peaking at #60 in the UK, marking Sting's lowest charting single since "They Dance Alone" reached #94 in 1988. It also became Mary J. Blige's smallest hit there since the first release of "Real Love" in 1992.

The song was rereleased in 2021 on Sting's compilation album Duets.

Track listings
 "Whenever I Say Your Name" (Album Version)
 "Whenever I Say Your Name" (will.i.am Remix featuring The Black Eyed Peas)
 "Whenever I Say Your Name" (Salaam Remi Groove Mix)

Charts

References

2003 singles
Sting (musician) songs
Mary J. Blige songs
Male–female vocal duets
Songs written by Sting (musician)
Grammy Award for Best Pop Collaboration with Vocals
2003 songs